Huron Falls can refer to several waterfalls in the United States:

Lower Huron Falls on the Huron River (northern Michigan)
Huron Falls, one of 24 named waterfalls in Ricketts Glen State Park in Pennsylvania